Pogonocherus jaekeli is an extinct species of beetle in the family Cerambycidae, that existed during the Lower Oligocene. It was described by Zang in 1905.

References

Pogonocherini
Beetles described in 1905